The Călimani National Park ( is a protected area (national park category II IUCN) situated in Romania and located at Northern side of Eastern Carpathians (Bistrita – Nasaud, Harghita, Mures and Suceava counties). In the administrativ territory of counties Mureș (45%), Suceava (35%), Harghita (15%), and Bistrița-Năsăud. It has 64,000 acres. It protects the Călimani Mountains.

See also 
 Protected areas of Romania

References 

National parks of Romania
Protected areas established in 2000
Geography of Mureș County
Geography of Suceava County
Geography of Harghita County
Geography of Bistrița-Năsăud County
Tourist attractions in Mureș County
Tourist attractions in Suceava County
Tourist attractions in Harghita County
Tourist attractions in Bistrița-Năsăud County